Green Valley is a common place name in English. 
It may refer to:

Places

Antarctica
 Green Valley (Antarctica), in the Thiel Mountains

Australia
 Green Valley, New South Wales, a suburb of Sydney

Brazil
 Green Valley, nightclub in Camboriú, Brazil.

United States

California
 Green Valley, El Dorado County, California, a former settlement
 Green Valley, Los Angeles County, California, a census-designated place
 Green Valley, (Cuyamaca Mountains, California), in San Diego County
 Green Valley, Solano County, California, a census-designated place
 Green Valley, former name of Greenwood, El Dorado County, California
 Green Valley of Russian River Valley AVA, an American Viticultural Area in Sonoma County
 Green Valley Creek, a stream in Sonoma County
 Green Valley Acres, California, an unincorporated community in El Dorado County

Wisconsin
 Green Valley, Marathon County, Wisconsin, a town
 Green Valley, Shawano County, Wisconsin, a town
 Green Valley (CDP), Wisconsin, an unincorporated census-designated place in the town of Green Valley, Shawano County

Other states
 Green Valley, Arizona, a census-designated place in Pima County
 Green Valley, Illinois, a village in Tazewell County
 Green Valley, Maryland, an unincorporated area and former census-designated place in Frederick County
 Green Valley, Minnesota, an unincorporated community in Lyon County
 Green Valley Township, Becker County, Minnesota
 Green Valley Township, Holt County, Nebraska
 Green Valley, Henderson, a planned community in Henderson, Nevada
 Green Valley, Ohio, an unincorporated community in Knox County
 Green Valley, South Dakota, a census-designated place and unincorporated community in Pennington County
 Green Valley, Virginia
 Green Valley, Kanawha County, West Virginia
 Green Valley, Mercer County, West Virginia
 Green Valley, Nicholas County, West Virginia

Other places
Green Valley (Mars), landing site of NASA's Phoenix lander within Vastitas Borealis

Music
 Green Valley (band), a Spanish reggae-dancehall group
"Green Valley", song from ...So the Story Goes
"Green Valley", a 2012 song by Calvin Harris from 18 Months
"The Green Valley", song by Puscifer from Conditions of My Parole

Other uses
Green valley, a part of the Galaxy color–magnitude diagram
Greenvalley Public School, Kerala, India
The green valley phase in galactic evolution, between more frequently observed blue and red galaxies, as illustrated on a galaxy color–magnitude diagram.

See also
 Greendell (disambiguation)
 Greendale (disambiguation)
 Greenvale (disambiguation)
 Green (disambiguation)
 Valley (disambiguation)
 Grunthal (disambiguation) (German for "Green Valley")
 Valverde (disambiguation) (Spanish for "Green Valley")